The 1995 season was Santos FC's eightieth third season in existence and club's thirty-sixth in the top flight of Brazilian football since Brasileirão era.

Players

Squad

Source: Acervo Santista

Statistics

Appearances and goals

Source: Match reports in Competitive matches

Goalscorers

Source: Match reports in Competitive matches

Transfers

In

Out

Friendlies

Competitions

Campeonato Brasileiro

Results summary

First stage

Matches

Second stage

Matches

Semi-final

Final

Campeonato Paulista

Results summary

First stage

Matches

Final stage

Matches

Copa dos Campeões Mundiais

First stage

Matches

Final

Supercopa Libertadores

Round of 16

References

External links
Official Site

1995
Brazilian football clubs 1995 season